The Erynnini are a tribe in the skipper butterfly subfamily Pyrginae. They are a moderately diverse but quite plesiomorphic and inconspicuous group, and except for the Holarctic species of the type genus Erynnis occur only in the Neotropics.

Formerly, when only four tribes of Pyrginae were recognized, they were included in the Pyrgini, which at that time contained a massive number of genera. But the Pyrginae have since been reorganized to make them and their tribes monophyletic, leading most modern authors to treat the Erynnini as distinct tribe. However, the old circumscription of the Pyrgini was by and large just as correct from a phylogenetic perspective.

The tribe of the Pyrgini sensu lato most closely related to the Pyrgini sensu stricto are the strikingly different Achlyodidini. As many consider it desirable to treat this lineage as a distinct tribe, the Erynnini naturally need to be considered distinct too.

Genera
The genera are listed here in the presumed phylogenetic sequence:
Subtribe Clitina 
Subtribe Erynnina
 Anastrus
 Chiomara
 Sostrata
 Potamanaxas
 Gorgythion
 Anaxas
 Chiothion
 Crenda
 Echelatus
 Festivia
 Hoodus
 Tolius
Unplaced taxa
 Grais – hermit skipper
 Erynnis – duskywings
 Gesta
 Mylon
 Ebrietas
 Timochares
 Cycloglypha
 Ephyriades Hübner, [1819]
 Tosta
 Theagenes
 Helias
 Camptopleura

Footnotes

References

  (2009): Tree of Life Web Project – Erynnini. Version of 2009-JUN-14. Retrieved 2009-DEC-26.

 

Taxa named by Charles Thomas Brues
Butterfly tribes